Gordon Francis 'Whopper' Lane (30 May 1921 – 21 July 1973) was an Australian rules footballer who represented the Essendon and South Melbourne in the VFL. He played as a forward with a strong overhead mark and was rated by Jack Dyer in 1946 as 'the best centre half forward in the game'.

He is best remembered for his performances in Essendon's Grand Finals of the 1940s. In the 1942 final he kicked six goals and in 1946 kicked seven.

Lane missed out on a chance to play in another Grand Final in 1947 due to him breaking his ribs in the preliminary final. He was injured again the following season, this time it was his knee and he moved to South Melbourne in 1950 where he would be both captain and coach for three years.

External links

Profile at Essendonfc.com.au

1921 births
Australian rules footballers from Melbourne
Sydney Swans players
Sydney Swans coaches
Essendon Football Club players
Essendon Football Club Premiership players
1973 deaths
Three-time VFL/AFL Premiership players
People from Essendon, Victoria